Giles Nuttgens (born 1960), BSC is a British cinematographer, perhaps best known for the 2016 film Hell or High Water, for which he received a 2017 BAFTA nomination and 2020 film Enola Holmes.  Fans of independent art house fare may also be familiar with his work on Deepa Mehta's "Elements trilogy", consisting of the films Fire (1996), Earth (1998) and Water (2005), as well as Mehta's adaptation of Salman Rushdie's epic novel Midnight's Children (2012). He received critical acclaim and the 2006 Genie Award for Best Achievement in Cinematography (Canadian Academy Award) for his work on Water.

He has also collaborated on more than one occasion with Scott McGehee and David Siegel on The Deep End and Bee Season, and David Mackenzie on Young Adam, Asylum, Hallam Foe and most recently, Hell or High Water.  He won the 2001 Sundance Film Festival's Cinematography Award for The Deep End.

Career
Nuttgens began his career with the BBC TV for the Natural History documentary unit in 1984, and rose up through the camera assistant ranks, and by the age of 25 he was one of the youngest film cameramen ever in the BBC. After many years living in Paris, he relocated to Barcelona in late 2003.  He is fluent in English, French and Spanish.

Although best known for independent films, he also has worked on major commercial productions such as Enola Holmes, Hell or High Water the Star Wars prequels, Battlefield Earth and Swimfan.

Filmography
{| class="wikitable"
|-
! Year
! Title
! Director
! Notes
|-
| 1992
| Electric Moon
| Pradip Krishen
|
|-
| 1996
| Fire
| Deepa Mehta
|
|-
| 1997
| Keep the Aspidistra Flying
| Robert Bierman
|
|-
| 1998
| Earth
| Deepa Mehta
|
|-
| 2000
| Battlefield Earth
| Roger Christian
|
|-
| 2001
| The Deep End
| Scott McGeheeDavis Siegel
|
|-
| 2002
| Swimfan
| John Polson
|
|-
| 2003
| Young Adam
| David Mackenzie
|
|-
| 2004
| If Only
| Gil Junger
|
|-
|rowspan=2| 2005
| Bee Season
| Scott McGeheeDavid Siegel
|
|-
| Water
| Deepa Mehta
| Won - Genie Award for Best Achievement in Cinematography
|-
|rowspan=2| 2007
| The Good Night
| Jake Paltrow
|
|-
| Hallam Foe
| David Mackenzie
|
|-
| 2008
| Heaven on Earth
| Deepa Mehta
|
|-
| 2009
| The Loss of a Teardrop Diamond
| Jodie Markell
|
|-
| 2010
| Saint John of Las Vegas
| Hue Rhodes
|
|-
| 2011
| Perfect Sense
| David Mackenzie
|
|-
| 2012
| [[Midnight's Children (film)|Midnight's Children]]| Deepa Mehta
|
|-
|rowspan=2| 2014
| Young Ones| Jake Paltrow
|
|-
| God Help the Girl| Stuart Murdoch
|
|-
|rowspan=2| 2016
| The Fundamentals of Caring| Rob Burnett
| 
|-
| Hell or High Water| David Mackenzie
| Nominated - BAFTA Film Award for Cinematography
|-
| 2017
| Grain| Semih Kaplanoğlu
|
|-
|rowspan=2| 2018
| The Wedding Guest| Michael Winterbottom
|
|-
| Colette| Wash Westmoreland
|
|-
| 2019
| Greed| Michael Winterbottom
|
|-
| 2020
| Think Like a Dog| Gil Junger
| 
|-
| 2020
| Enola Holmes| Harry Bradbeer
|
|-
| 2021
| Montana Story| Scott McGeheeDavid Siegel
|
|-
| 2022
| Enola Holmes 2| Harry Bradbeer
| Post-production
|-
|}

References

External links
 
 Giles Nuttgens at The New York Times''

British cinematographers
Living people
Best Cinematography Genie and Canadian Screen Award winners
1960 births